The Atractiellomycetes are class of fungi in the Pucciniomycotina subdivision of the Basidiomycota. The class consists of a single order, the Atractiellales, which contains 3 families, 10 genera, and 58 species.

References

Basidiomycota classes
Pucciniomycotina
Taxa named by Franz Oberwinkler